Lipotriches basipicta is a species of bee in the family Halictidae.

References
 www.gbif.org/species/119893667
 www.animaldiversity.org/accounts/Lipotriches_basipicta/classification/
 www.eol.org/pages/2745803/overview

Halictidae
Insects described in 1908